Chambers Pillar (Aboriginal name Idracowra or Etikaura) is a sandstone formation some  south of Alice Springs in the Northern Territory of Australia.

Formation

History
John McDouall Stuart was the first European to see Chambers Pillar, reaching the site in April 1860, and naming it after James Chambers, one of his South Australian sponsors. The rock formations was once an important landmark for pioneers travelling from Adelaide to Alice Springs prior to the establishment of the railways in the 1920s. Several early explorers including Alfred Giles and John Ross, leaders of the second cross-continental expedition in 1870, have left their mark on the rockface. The initials of each are still visible as J Ross and AC 1870. Subsequently numerous other visitors have illegally added graffiti by carving names in the soft sandstone at the base of the pillar.

The pillar is a Site of Aboriginal Significance and features in the  dreamtime traditions of local Indigenous Australians. Their legend says that the pillar is the Gecko ancestor Itirkawara, who was exiled for taking a wife from the wrong skin group.

Services
Chambers Pillar is reached via the unsealed Old South Road from Alice Springs to Maryvale Station. A 4WD vehicle is required after the Maryvale turnoff to Chambers Pillar. Drivers will encounter deep sand drifts and steep jump ups, as well as rolling sandy hills with limited sight lines and the deeply corrugated surfaces typical of Australian outback roads. Camping is permitted at a campground between Chambers Pillar and Castle Rock with amenities including barbeques, carpark, picnic area and public toilets.

See also
 Ewaninga Rock Carvings Conservation Reserve
 Henbury Meteorites Conservation Reserve
 Rainbow Valley Conservation Reserve
 Uluṟu-Kata Tjuṯa National Park
 Watarrka National Park
 West MacDonnell National Park

References

External links
Fact Sheet: Chambers Pillar Historical Reserve (Parks and Wildlife Commission NT)

Landforms of the Northern Territory
Rock formations of Australia